Yoko Alender (born 13 June 1979, in Tallinn) is an Estonian architect, civil servant and a politician. She is a member of the XIV Estonian Parliament the Riigikogu, and acts as chair for the Environment Committee. She was also a member of the XIII Estonian Parliament in 2015-19. Since 2014, she is a member of the liberal Reform Party. From 2013 to 2014, Alender belonged to conservative Pro Patria and Res Publica Union.

Education
From 1986-1989, she attended the Tallinn School No. 7. In 1989, she commenced studies at the Estonian School in Stockholm, where she continued until 1995. She attended the Södra Latins gymnasium from 1995-1999. In 1999, she commenced studies at the Estonian Academy of Arts, in the Faculty of Architecture and Urban Planning, graduating in 2010 with a master's degree in architecture and city planning.

Career
In 2001, she was a founding member of the Estonian Institute of Buddhism, where she continues to be a member. From 2008–2012 she worked in the Tallinn Culture and Heritage Department, as a Chief Specialist of the Agency, working with heritage sites. 2013-2014 she worked for the Estonian Ministry of Culture, as an adviser on architecture and design.

She is also trained and works as a yoga teacher and consultant on personal development, yoga and mindfulness.

Personal
She is the daughter of renowned Estonian singer, Urmas Alender. When Alender was 15, her father died in the sinking of the MS Estonia in the Baltic Sea. Alender has four children. Her husband is a musician, DJ Julm and restaurateur (F Hoone & Frank & Tabac).
She has published an article entitled "My Estonian dream for 2050".

References

External links
 

1979 births
21st-century Estonian women politicians
Architects from Tallinn
Estonian Academy of Arts alumni
Estonian Reform Party politicians
Estonian women architects
Isamaa politicians
Living people
Members of the Riigikogu, 2015–2019
Members of the Riigikogu, 2019–2023
Members of the Riigikogu, 2023–2027
Politicians from Tallinn
Women members of the Riigikogu